Chandrahas Chaupal is an Indian politician from Bihar and a Member of the Bihar Legislative Assembly. Sri Chaupal won the Singheshwar Assembly constituency on the RJD ticket in the 2020 Bihar Legislative Assembly election. He defeated Dr. Ramesh Rishidev, a former Schedule Caste & Schedule Tribe Welfare minister of Bihar from Janta Dal United in his first attempt. He is also appointed Shunykal Sabhapati.

Personal life
He is the resident of Raibhid village of Shankarpur Block in Madhepura Distric, Bihar. His father Baldev Chaupal is a retired school teacher. Sri Chaupal has done Intermediate in 1993 from Saharsa college now named as M.L.T College, Saharsa.

Social life
Shri Chandrahas Chaupal was connected with social work since last 20 years. He has represented his Panchayat earlier by winning in Panchayat Election.

References

Living people
Bihar MLAs 2020–2025
Rashtriya Janata Dal politicians
Year of birth missing (living people)